The 1972–73 Atlanta Flames season was the inaugural season for the Flames' franchise.

Offseason

NHL Amateur Draft

NHL Expansion Draft

Regular season
When it was first announced that Atlanta would have an NHL franchise many hockey observers thought that a team based in the southern United States was a ludicrous and foolish move, especially since the talent pool had been diluted by repeated expansion and the upstart WHA. Nevertheless, the team quickly began front office operations, naming young St. Louis Blues assistant general manager Cliff Fletcher as general manager. Soon after, Fletcher had found the team its first coach: former Canadiens star forward Bernie "Boom-Boom" Geoffrion.

The team was a pleasant surprise in its first season on the ice, its success built on new star goaltenders Dan Bouchard and Phil Myre, solid defensemen such as Randy Manery and Pat Quinn, and forwards Rey Comeau, (captain) Keith McCreary, Larry Romanchych and Bob Leiter. Despite its inexperience as a team, the Flames were quite successful in the beginning of their rookie season, posting a 20–19–8 record by January 19, 1973, off the success of their young goaltending tandem. However, they lost 19 of their last 31 games, finishing out of the playoffs.  Part of the problem as that in defiance of all geographic reality, the Flames were placed in the West Division—saddling them with some of the longest road trips in the league—and ultimately, the team's excellent defense and goaltending were sabotaged by its lack of goalscoring, finishing second worst in the NHL in that category.  However, their 65 points were 35 better than the Islanders, who toiled at the bottom of the East Division.

Season standings

Schedule and results

Player statistics

Skaters
Note: GP = Games played; G = Goals; A = Assists; Pts = Points; PIM = Penalty minutes

†Denotes player spent time with another team before joining Atlanta.  Stats reflect time with the Flames only.
‡Traded mid-season

Goaltending
Note: GP = Games played; TOI = Time on ice (minutes); W = Wins; L = Losses; OT = Overtime/shootout losses; GA = Goals against; SO = Shutouts; GAA = Goals against average

Transactions
The Flames were involved in the following transactions during the 1972–73 season.

Trades

Free agents

Claimed off waivers

References
 Flames on Hockey Database
 Flames Game Tracker on Database Hockey

Atlanta
Atlanta
Atlanta Flames seasons